The Findlay Range is a mountain range lying parallel to and west of the Lyttelton Range, extending between Grigg Peak and Sorensen Peak in the Admiralty Mountains of Victoria Land, Antarctica. This topographical feature was so named by the New Zealand Antarctic Place-Names Committee after Robert H. Findlay, a geologist with the New Zealand Antarctic Division, Department of Scientific and Industrial Research, leader of a New Zealand Antarctic Research Program geological party to this area, 1981–82. These mountains lies situated on the Pennell Coast, a portion of Antarctica lying between Cape Williams and Cape Adare.

References 

Mountain ranges of Victoria Land
Pennell Coast